F49 may refer to:
 INS Sahyadri (F49)
 Brazilian frigate Rademaker (F49)